Ribeirinha is a parish in the municipality of Angra do Heroísmo on the island of Terceira in the Azores. The population in 2011 was 2,684, in an area of 7.53 km2.

References

Freguesias of Angra do Heroísmo